Lê Duy Thanh (born 19 December 1990) is a Vietnamese footballer who plays as a midfielder for V.League 2 club Khánh Hòa.

References 

1990 births
Living people
Vietnamese footballers
Association football midfielders
V.League 1 players
Hoang Anh Gia Lai FC players
Can Tho FC players
People from Ninh Thuận province